Allan Riverstone McCulloch (20 June 1885 – 1 September 1925) was a prominent Australian ichthyologist.

Born in Sydney, Australia, McCulloch began his scientific career at the age of 13 as an unpaid assistant to Edgar Ravenswood Waite in the Australian Museum where Waite encouraged McCulloch to study zoology. Three years later, he was employed as a "mechanical assistant", and five years after that, as curator of fishes, a post he held until his death.

McCulloch collected and published prolifically; from his first paper in 1906 (published in Records of the Australian Museum), no year passed without his making a contribution to science, and he wrote over 100 original papers in all, many including his own illustrations. McCulloch travelled widely for his collections, including trips to Queensland, Lord Howe Island, New Guinea, the Great Barrier Reef and various Pacific islands. His major research interest was in fish, but he was also given the responsibility of the crustacean collection from 1905 to 1921, and he wrote several significant papers on decapods. In 1922 McCulloch journeyed through Papua with Captain Frank Hurley. In 1922 his Check List of Fishes and Fish-like Animals of New South Wales was published by the Royal Zoological Society of New South Wales.

McCulloch's hectic schedule seems to have damaged his health, and he was forced to spend a year off work for his health's sake. He died, however, in Honolulu in 1925. His collection ultimately included over 40,000 specimens, and he was considered "the greatest authority on fish in the southern hemisphere" (David Starr Jordan). A monument to his memory stands on Lord Howe Island. In 1930, A Check List of the Fishes Recorded from Australia, edited by Gilbert P. Whitley from McCulloch's materials was published as Memoir V of the Australian museum of Sydney.

See also
:Category:Taxa named by Allan Riverstone McCulloch
wikidata query for taxa named by Allan Riverston McCulloch

Publications

References
McCulloch, Allan Riverstone (1885 - 1925) at Bright Sparcs

External links

Australian carcinologists
Australian ichthyologists
Scientists from Sydney
1885 births
1925 deaths
20th-century Australian zoologists